The Pigeon Forge Police Department, sometimes referred to as "PFPD", is the primary law enforcement organization serving Pigeon Forge, Tennessee in the United States.

According to its website, "applying technology to law enforcement has been a primary goal of the Pigeon Forge Police Department, second only to the application of the community policing philosophy."  In addition to the department's publicized application of technology, the police department has specialized units and organization, which is notable considering the city of Pigeon Forge only has approximately 5,000 residents. The department is notable among police departments in Tennessee for having a Tactical Response Unit, a type of SWAT rescue team that is typically found in police departments of larger cities.  The police run Citizen Police Academy is noteworthy.

The Chief of Police was Jack H. Baldwin. Chief Baldwin has announced his retirement effective February 2, 2018 after 42 years in office. He was replaced by Richard Catlett.

Growth of Pigeon Forge
Colonel Samuel Wear, a Revolutionary War veteran who fought at the Battle of Kings Mountain, helped establish a military post at Walden's Creek around 1781, which is currently a historical site in Pigeon Forge.  By 1907, the unincorporated village only had a population of 154.  The village was not incorporated into a town until 1961.  Compared to 30 years ago when there were only two stoplights on Highway 441, the main city street, the Parkway, as it is now called, has six lanes of traffic and multiple stoplights.  The growth of the city coincides with the establishment of the Dollywood theme park, named after singer Dolly Parton in 1981.  This and other attractions results in the city having 11 million tourists a year.   This growth has resulted in the Pigeon Forge Police Department having a large force compared to the resident population as well as the establishment of several specialized departments within the police department.

Personnel
The Pigeon Forge Police Department has 70 employees. 1 chief, 1 captain, 1 training officer, 2 school resource officers, 1 fleet and communications supervisor, 4 lieutenants, 3 sergeants, 6 corporals, 11 communications officers, 3 records clerks and 5 detectives.  The Patrol Division is assigned 38 officers. The Traffic Division has 8 officers and The K-9 Division has 3 officers. Of which, 4 are lieutenants, 3 are sergeants and 6 are corporals.

Rank structure

Specialized units

Tactical Rescue Unit (TRU)
The police department is unusual in that a force of this size has a special SWAT team called the Tactical Rescue Unit (TRU TEAM).  The units formal purpose is to be "deployed in those situations or events which by their nature are more dangerous or hazardous to officers than the majority of calls for police action, and which may constitute or contribute to grave peril to the public."  At least two years of department service and completion the basic training test is required for induction into the unit. Their job is potentially very dangerous given the situations that SWAT teams of other cities have encountered. They are trained in the arts of hostage rescuing, situations involving barricaded gunmen, sniper fire, etc.

Criminal Investigations Division
The unit consists of 5 investigators. It consists of a supervisor, three investigators, juvenile officer, and a crime scene technician.  Officers are sometimes assigned to the Drug Task Force and Street Crimes Task Force. One position in CID is a rotating position. Allowing Patrol Officers a chance at 4 months of coming off the road and working alongside the detectives

Other units

A Motorcycle Patrol Unit, currently consisting of 6 officers.
The Bicycle Unit, currently consisting of 3 officers.
Operations Support Division that includes the Communications Center and Records and Court Clerks
The Crisis Negotiations Unit (CNU) consists 2 teams of 5 personnel on each. Trained to respond to any Crisis or Hostage situation. The CNU has High Tech Equipment to communicate with subjects in barricaded situations and they work alongside the Tactical Response Unit

Crime data
From 2001-2004, there were no murders and between 4 and 6 robberies per year in the city. There were 78 to 198 burglaries during each of those years during that period.

Recent history
In 2006, the Pigeon Forge Police department was involved in a case where an amusement park manager was accused of murder.  The trial was reported by U.S. cable TV station, CourtTV.  The accused man was eventually convicted of reckless homicide, instead.

Citizen Police Academy
The police department operates a citizen police academy, established in 1998, holds weekly Tuesday evening classes for four months each year.  The program seeks to educate the public about police duties.  The curriculum includes having pupils ride with police officers on patrols.  However, completion of the course does not grant certification to become a police officer; it is solely an opportunity for members of the local community to experience the Police Department hands-on. The citizens police academy has limited space each session of 25 or less. Each session will include classroom time along with actual hands on simulated training in the field. The yearly citizens police academy usually begins at the end of January or beginning of February of each year and is open to anyone that can attend every Tuesday evening for a 4-month period.

Museum
The police department has retired police equipment on display among the 5,000 displayed items at the Carbo's Police Museum in Pigeon Force.  The museum is privately owned and not operated by the department.
UPDATE: Carbos has closed as of the fall of 2009 after nearly 35 years of business

See also

 List of law enforcement agencies in Tennessee

References

External links
 government link Pigeon Forge Police Department Homepage
 photo of police department headquarters 
 photo of Tactical Response Unit 

Municipal police departments of Tennessee
Sevier County, Tennessee